This list contains the names of albums that contain a hidden track and also information on how to find them. Not all printings of an album contain the same track arrangements, so some copies of a particular album may not have the hidden track(s) listed below. Some of these tracks may be hidden in the pregap, and some hidden simply as a track following the listed tracks. The list is ordered by artist name using the surname where appropriate.

 V: You Stood Up (2004): "You Got Me" is hidden in the album's pregap. Another hidden track "Just Eighteen" is in Track 18
 V Shape Mind: 
 Metric (2000): There is a hidden spoken word track at the end of the final song "Pretty On the Outside".
 Cul-De-Sac (album) (2003): There is an unlisted twelfth track "Every Little Thing (E.L.T.)" after a three-minute period of silence following the final track.
 The Vaccines, What Did You Expect from the Vaccines? (2011): "Somebody Else's Child" can be heard approximately a minute after "Family Friend," the last track, ends
 Vanessa-Mae, Subject to Change (2001): "Tourmaline" (after a minute of silence in the last track)
 Van Halen, Women and Children First (1980): "Growth" (Immediately after the song "In a Simple Rhyme")
 Eddie Vedder, Into the Wild: After the final track "Guaranteed" there are a few minutes silence before Eddie Vedder plays through the song again, but hums the vocals in place of the actual lyrics.
 Laura Veirs: Untitled Track/Magnetized (original) (2005): "Year of Meteors" (Follows a period of silence after "Lake Swimming")
 Velvet Revolver, Libertad (2007): Shortly after the song "Gravedancer" ends, there's a secret song called "Don't Drop That Dime."
 Versus: Two Cents Plus Tax (1998): "Oriental American" is hidden in the album's pregap
 The Verve, Urban Hymns (1997): "Deep Freeze" (at the 13-minute mark of "Come On") (on later MP3 download copies of this album, "Come On" is trimmed of all silence and "Deep Freeze" presented as a separate track)
 The Victorian English Gentlemens Club:
 The Victorian English Gentlemens Club (2006): Following the final track, "Cannonball", is an untitled song.
 Blood Pie (2011): At the end of each side of the cassette, unlisted messages exist to respectively state to turn the tape over and to thank the listener.
 Bag of Meat (2011): After the final track, "Not Waving But Drowning", the hidden track "I.Want.You.Dead" (originating from Blood Pie) plays.
 Virgin Black, Sombre Romantic (2000): Track "Outro" is unlisted.
 Virus, Bio-Level 4: There are nine short hidden tracks containing the same voice sample.
 Vitalic, OK Cowboy (2005): "One Million Dollar Studio" (Rewind before opening track, song is about 1-minute and 20 seconds long)
 Vitamin C, Vitamin C (1999): "Graduation (Friends Forever) (Student Interview Mix)" (Track 13)
 Vive la Fête, Nuit Blanche (2006)
 The Von Bondies, Pawn Shoppe Heart (2004): An untitled secret track that starts at 6:55 on the track "Pawn Shoppe Heart"; sounds like an extension of the aforementioned song (but is actually a cover of "Try a Little Tenderness").

See also
 List of backmasked messages
 List of albums with tracks hidden in the pregap

References 

V